Hossein Hosseini may refer to:
Hossein Hosseini (footballer, born 1988)
Hossein Hosseini (footballer, born 1992)
Hossein Hosseini (footballer, born 1995)